After Sundown is a 2006 American horror-Western film directed by Christopher Abram and Michael W. Brown, written by Abram, and starring Susana Gibb, Reece Rios, Natalie Jones, and co-directors Brown and Abram and produced and executive produced by Keith Randal Duncan. The plot is about a vampire gunslinger from the Old West who terrorizes a modern-day town when his bride is revived.

Plot 

After a female corpse in perfect condition is exhumed, two funeral home employees remove a wooden stake from it. The corpse instantly revives and reveals itself as a vampire. Sensing the return of his bride, the  vampire who created her, an Old West gunslinger, comes to the town and begins to turn the people into zombies that serve his will.

Cast 
 Susana Gibb as Shannon
 Reece Rios as Mikey
 Natalie Jones as Molly
 Michael W. Brown as Benjamin
 Christopher Abram as the vampire
 Jake Billingsley as Sheriff Jimmy
 Joey Galt as the deputy
 Chris Whatley as the preacher
 Jamie Amaral as Niki
 Gayle Massey as the preacher's wife
 Angela Gair as the midwife

Release 
Lionsgate Home Entertainment released After Sundown on DVD on July 11, 2006.

Reception 
Bloody Disgusting rated it 2/5 stars and wrote that film is too unfocused and should have been set solely in the Old West.  Jon Condit of Dread Central rated it 1/5 stars and wrote that the plot holes ruin the film despite the attempts by the cast to take the film seriously.  Ian Jane of DVD Talk rated it 2/5 stars and wrote, "In short, the filmmakers show potential and are obviously an ambitious lot – they just didn't have either the means or the experience to pull it off this time." Mac McEntire of DVD Verdict wrote, "After Sundown promises low budget cowboy vampire zombie action, and that's just what it delivers. I doubt it'll ever be considered a horror classic, but fans of the genre could do a lot worse."

See also 
 Weird West, a subgenre of Western films to which this film belongs

References

External links 
 
 

2006 films
2006 horror films
2000s Western (genre) horror films
American supernatural horror films
American Western (genre) horror films
2000s English-language films
American vampire films
American zombie films
2000s American films